Zone Raiders is a futuristic vehicular combat video game for DOS and Macintosh focused around hovercars. Developed by Image Space Incorporated and published by Virgin Interactive, it was released in North America in 1995. The music in the game was created by the band CONTAGIAN, of which some of the Virgin Studios Audio Department were members.

Production 
Zone Raiders was developed by Image Space Incorporated and published by Virgin Interactive. It was released in late 1995 on a CD-ROM format. A demo was also made available via a free Software USA shareware disc

Digital re-release
The game was re-released digitally as a DRM-Free exclusive on ZOOM-Platform.com through a partnership between Image Space Incorporated and the Jordan Freeman Group.

Reception
A reviewer for Next Generation applauded the game as "that rarest of animals – a first-person racer that truly conveys a sense of speed." He also praised the variety of weapons, innovative power-ups, secret passageways to discover, and four-player networked play. He scored it four out of five stars. The game received a positive review from Computer Game Review, netting a "Golden Triad" score. The magazine called it "one of the best arcade style shoot 'em ups in years." A reviewer for Joystick described the game as having "borrowed its 'straight to the point' aspect" from Terminal Velocity and noted that the quality of the graphics worsened in later levels when extra details appear on the screen.

The game was listed as a "ZOOM DRM-Free Exclusive" among the Bestsellers. Computer Gaming World's Martin E. Circulis gave Zone Raiders three stars out of five, describing the graphics as "a competent, if somewhat uninspired design" and that "the missions are fairly interesting, but most will find too few for their game-dollar." Scott Wolf of PC Gamer called it "a high-tech post-apocalyptic road trip that goes right for the jugular with its mix of driving challenge and shoot-'em-up fun."

References

External links

1995 video games
Science fiction racing games
Games commercially released with DOSBox
DOS games
Classic Mac OS games
Image Space Incorporated games
Video games developed in the United States
Virgin Interactive games